The Oxford Parliament, also known as the Mongrel Parliament, was the Parliament assembled by Charles I of England for the first time on 22 January 1644 and adjourned for the last time on 10 March 1645, with the purpose of being an instrument of the Royalist war campaign.

Charles was advised by Edward Hyde and others not to dissolve the Long Parliament as this would violate the statute of 1641 which said that Parliament could not be dissolved without its own consent. So all members of the Long Parliament were summoned by King Charles to assemble for a session of Parliament to be held at Christ Church Hall, Oxford. Eighty-two peers, which was most of the House of Lords, and 175 commoners, which was about one-third of the House of Commons, heeded the summons and came. Sir Sampson Eure was elected as Speaker of the House of Commons.

The Parliament met a number of times during the First English Civil War and was seen by Charles as a way of raising revenue. However, some of the members defected back to Westminster because they did not like his alliance with Irish Catholics, and others argued strongly for a negotiated peace with the Long Parliament in Westminster Hall.

The first session lasted from 22 January 1644 until 16 April 1644. The second session was from 8 October 1644 until 10 March 1645.

Not much is known of its proceedings because all its records were burnt just before Oxford fell to Parliamentary forces in 1646.

See also
 List of parliaments of England
 Oxford Parliament (1258)
 Oxford Parliament (1681)

Further reading
 British Civil Wars: Oxford Parliament 
 Oxford Parliament

References

1644 establishments in England
1645 disestablishments
1645 in England
17th-century English parliaments
Parliament (1644)
Christ Church, Oxford
1644 in politics
17th century in Oxfordshire